Carlos Clayton Ratliff (October 18, 1910 – October 3, 1961) was an American football, basketball and baseball player and coach. He served as the head football coach (1946–1952), head basketball coach (1945–1951), and head baseball coach (1947) at Glenville State College in Glenville, West Virginia.

References

External links
 Glenville Hall of Fame profile
 
 

1910 births
1961 deaths
American men's basketball players
Baseball shortstops
Baseball third basemen
Basketball coaches from West Virginia
Bluefield Blue-Grays players
Glenville State Pioneers and Lady Pioneers athletic directors
Glenville State Pioneers baseball coaches
Glenville State Pioneers baseball players
Glenville State Pioneers basketball coaches
Glenville State Pioneers basketball players
Glenville State Pioneers football coaches
Glenville State Pioneers football players
Welch Miners players
High school football coaches in West Virginia
People from Hinton, West Virginia
Players of American football from West Virginia
Baseball players from West Virginia
Basketball players from West Virginia